This article handles air-to-surface special attack units by Action Order only. Therefore, this article does not handle air-to-air suicide attack groups like the Shinten Air Superiority Group (震天制空隊 Shinten Seikūtai) (.ja), suicide boat group the Army Maritime Assault Squadron (陸軍海上挺進戦隊 Rikugun Kaijō Teishin Sentai) (.ja) and other voluntary special/suicide attacks.

Air unit names in this article.Japanese military unit names have various translations on en.Wikipedia. This article uses the following side-by-side translations to avoid confusion.

Hakkō Unit

Original unit; Akeno Instructing Flying Division
27 November 1944
11× Ki-43 III; U.S. convoy in Leyte Gulf.
7 December 1944
1× Ki-43 III; U.S. convoy in Ormoc Bay.
12 December 1944
1× Ki-43 III; U.S. convoy off Baybay.

Original unit; Hitachi Instructing Flying Division
5 December 1944
3× Ki-43 III; U.S. ship in Surigao Strait.
7 December 1944
2× Ki-43 III; U.S. convoy in Ormoc Bay.
13 December 1944
1× Ki-43 III; U.S. ship off Mindanao.

Original unit; 51st Educational Flying Division
24 November 1944
3× Ki-43 III; U.S. ship off Manicani.
26 November 1944
2× Ki-43 III; U.S. ship in Leyte Gulf.
29 November 1944
6× Ki-43 III; U.S. ship in Leyte Gulf.
7 December 1944
1× Ki-43 III; U.S. ship in Ormoc Bay.

Original unit; 10th Flying Division
7 December 1944
7× Ki-43 III; U.S. ship in Ormoc Bay.
10 January 1945
1× Ki-43 III; U.S. ship in Lingayen Gulf.

Original unit; Hokota Instructing Flying Division
5 December 1944
3× Ki-51; U.S. ship off Suluan Island.
16 December 1944
2× Ki-51; U.S. ship off Mindoro.
18 December 1944
1× Ki-51; U.S. ship off Mindoro.
29 December 1944
3× Ki-51; U.S. ship off Mindoro.
6 January 1945
2× Ki-51; U.S. ship West of Luzon.

Original unit; Shimoshizu Instructing Flying Division
5 December 1944
7× Ki-51; U.S. ship in Surigao Strait.
8 December 1944
1× Ki-51; U.S. ship in Ormoc Bay.
12 December 1944
1× Ki-51; U.S. convoy off Baybay.
22 December 1944
1× Ki-51; U.S. ship off San Jose.
5 January 1945
3× Ki-51; U.S. carrier task force West of Luzon.
6 January 1945
1× Ki-51; U.S. ship off San Fernando.
8 January 1945
3× Ki-51; U.S. ship in Lingayen Gulf.

Original unit; Akeno Instructing Flying Division
10 December 1944
6× Ki-43 III; U.S. ship in Surigao Strait.
12 December 1944
1× Ki-43 III; U.S. convoy off Baybay.
17 December 1944
2× Ki-43 III; U.S. ship off Mindoro.

Original unit; Hokota Instructing Flying Division
7 December 1944
9× Ki-45 Kai c; U.S. ship in Ormoc Bay.
10 December 1944
3× Ki-45 Kai c; U.S. ship in Leyte Gulf.

Original unit; Akeno Instructing Flying Division
22 December 1944
1× Ki-43 III; U.S. ship off Mindoro.
4 January 1945
2× Ki-43 III; U.S. ship in Sulu Sea.
5 January 1945
3× Ki-43 III; U.S. carrier task force West of Luzon.
8 January 1945
3× Ki-43 III; U.S. carrier task force West of Luzon.
9 January 1945
2× Ki-43 III; U.S. ship in Leyte Gulf.

Original unit; Hitachi Instructing Flying Division
21 December 1944
5× Ki-43 III; U.S. ship off Mindoro.
22 December 1944
2× Ki-43 III; U.S. ship West of Panay.
29 December 1944
1× Ki-43 III; U.S. ship off Mindoro.
7 January 1945
1× Ki-43 III; U.S. ship in Lingayen Gulf.

Original unit; Hokota Instructing Flying Division
6 January 1945
1× Ki-45 Kai c; U.S. ship in Lingayen Gulf.
8 January 1945
4× Ki-45 Kai c; U.S. ship in Lingayen Gulf.
10 January 1945
1× Ki-45 Kai c; U.S. ship in Lingayen Gulf.

Original unit; Shimoshizu Instructing Flying Division
30 December 1944
5× Ki-51; U.S. convoy off San Jose.
4 January 1945
1× Ki-51; U.S. ship West of Luzon.
5 January 1945
1× Ki-51; U.S. ship West of Luzon.
8 January 1945
2× Ki-51; U.S. ship West of Luzon.

Shinbu Unit

Original unit; 100th Flying Brigade, 101st Flying Regiment, 102nd Flying Regiment
6 April 1945
8× Ki-84 I; Allied ship West of Okinawa Island.
12 April 1945
2× Ki-84 I; Allied ship West of Okinawa Island.

Original unit; 4th Flying Division, Navy 3rd Air Fleet
7 April 1945
1× Ki-46 III, 1× D4Y2;Allied ship off Kadena.
12 April 1945
1× Ki-46 III; Allied ship West of Okinawa Island.
14 May 1945
2× Ki-46 III; Allied ship West of Okinawa Island.

Original unit; Utsunomiya Instructing Flying Division
30 March 1945
1× Ki-21; Allied ship off Okinawa Island.

Original unit; 10th Flying Division
12× Ki-43 III; No-sorties, renamed Shinbu Unit No. 18 on 29 January 1945.

Original unit; 10th Flying Division
12× Ki-43 III; No-sorties, renamed Shinbu Unit No. 19 on 29 January 1945.

Original unit; 11th Flying Division
12× Ki-43 III; No-sorties, renamed Shinbu Unit No. 20 on 29 January 1945.

Original unit; 12th Flying Division
12× Ki-43 III; No-sorties, renamed Shinbu Unit No. 21 on 29 January 1945.

Original unit; 10th Flying Division
29 April 1945
6× Ki-43 III; Allied ship off Okinawa Island.
4 May 1945
1× Ki-43 III; Allied ship West of Okinawa Island.

Original unit; 10th Flying Division
29 April 1945
5× Ki-43 III; Allied ship off Okinawa Island.
4 May 1945
4× Ki-43 III; Allied ship West of Okinawa Island.

Original unit; 11th Flying Division
1 April 1945
1× Ki-43 IIIa; Allied ship North of Kerama Islands.
2 April 1945
2× Ki-43 IIIa; Allied ship North of Kerama Islands.
12 April 1945
3× Ki-43 IIIa; Allied ship West of Okinawa Island.
4 May 1945
1× Ki-43 IIIa; Allied ship West of Okinawa Island.

Original unit; 12th Flying Division
5 April 1945
1× Ki-43 III; Allied ship West of Okinawa Island.
26 May 1945
1× Ki-27 ; Allied ship West of Okinawa Island.

Original unit; Akeno Instructing Flying Division
3 April 1945
1× Ki-43 III; Allied ship West of Okinawa Island.
1× Ki-43 III; Allied ship West of Tokunoshima.
6 April 1945
2× Ki-43 III; Allied ship South-West of Okinawa Island.
7 April 1945
1× Ki-43 III; Allied ship South-West of Okinawa Island.
11 April 1945
1× Ki-43 III; Allied ship South of Kerama Islands.

Original unit; Shimoshizu Instructing Flying Division
1 April 1945
5× Ki-51; Allied ship South of Kerama Islands.
3 April 1945
5× Ki-51; Allied ship West of Okinawa Island.

Original unit; Hitachi Instructing Flying Division
28 April 1945
3× Ki-45 Kai c; Allied ship West of Okinawa Island.
4 May 1945
2× Ki-45 Kai c; Allied ship West of Okinawa Island.

Original unit; Hokota Instructing Flying Division
Ki-48 II; No-sorties or unfinished organization.

Original unit; Akeno Instructing Flying Division
25 May 1945
2× Ki-84 I; Allied ship West of Okinawa Island.
21 June 1945
4× Ki-84 I; Allied ship West of Okinawa Island.

Original unit; Akeno Instructing Flying Division
22 June 1945
6× Ki-84 I; Allied ship West of Okinawa Island.

Original unit; 1st Army Air Force
Ki-51; No-sorties or unfinished organization.

Original unit; First Army Air Force, 2nd Learning Squadron
7 April 1945
1× Ki-43 III; Allied ship in Nakagusuku Bay.
8 April 1945
3× Ki-43 III; Allied ship West of Okinawa Island.
18 April 1945
2× Ki-43 III; Allied ship West of Okinawa Island.
25 May 1945
2× Ki-43 III; Allied ship West of Okinawa Island.

Original unit; First Army Air Force, 30th Educational Squadron
10 April 1945
1× Ki-51; Allied ship West of Okinawa Island.
13 April 1945
2× Ki-51; Allied ship West of Okinawa Island.

Original unit; Second Army Air Force
Ki-51; No-sorties or unfinished organization.

Original unit; Second Army Air Force
Ki-51; No-sorties or unfinished organization.

Original unit; Akeno Instructing Flying Division
Ki-84 I; No-sorties or unfinished organization.

Original unit; Akeno Instructing Flying Division
Ki-84 I; No-sorties or unfinished organization.

Original unit; Hitachi Instructing Flying Division
Ki-84; No-sorties or unfinished organization.

Original unit; Tachiarai Army Flying School
Ki-36; No-sorties or unfinished organization.

Original unit; Tachiarai Army Flying School
Ki-36; No-sorties or unfinished organization.

Original unit; Tachiarai Army Flying School
Ki-36; No-sorties or unfinished organization.

Original unit; 2nd Army Air Force
Ki-43 III; No-sorties or unfinished organization.

Original unit; Akeno Instructing Flying Division
16 April 1945
6× Ki-27; Allied ship West of Okinawa Island.

Original unit; Second Army Air Force
Ki-27; No-sorties or unfinished organization.

Original unit; Akeno Instructing Flying Division
8 April 1945
4× Ki-27; Allied ship West of Okinawa Island.
9 April 1945
3× Ki-27; Allied ship West of Okinawa Island.
16 April 1945
1× Ki-27; Allied ship West of Okinawa Island.
4 May 1945
1× Ki-27; Allied ship West of Okinawa Island.

Original unit; Akeno Instructing Flying Division
6 April 1945
5× Ki-43 III; Allied ship West of Okinawa Island.
12 April 1945
3× Ki-43 III; Allied ship West of Okinawa Island.

Original unit; Hitachi Instructing Flying Division
6 April 1945
4× Ki-43 III; Allied ship West of Okinawa Island.
7 April 1945
2× Ki-43 III; Allied ship West of Okinawa Island.
11 May 1945
1× Ki-43 III; Allied ship West of Okinawa Island.
3 June 1945
1× Ki-43 III; Allied ship West of Okinawa Island.

Original unit; Hokota Instructing Flying Division
28 May 1945
9× Ki-45 Kai c; Allied ship West of Okinawa Island.

Original unit; Hokota Instructing Flying Division
6 April 1945
4× Ki-51; Allied ship West of Okinawa Island.
11 April 1945
1× Ki-51; Allied ship West of Okinawa Island.
12 April 1945
1× Ki-51; Allied ship off Kadena.
13 April 1945
1× Ki-51; Allied ship West of Okinawa Island.
15 April 1945
1× Ki-51; Allied ship West of Okinawa Island.

Original unit; Hamamatsu Instructing Flying Division
Ki-49; No-sorties or unfinished organization.

Original unit; Akeno Instructing Flying Division
28 May 1945
2× Ki-43 III; Allied ship West of Okinawa Island.
3 June 1945
4× Ki-43 III; Allied ship West of Okinawa Island.
8 June 1945
2× Ki-43 III; Allied ship West of Okinawa Island.

Original unit; Akeno Instructing Flying Division
6 May 1945
3× Ki-43 III; Allied ship West of Okinawa Island.
11 May 1945
2× Ki-43 III; Allied ship West of Okinawa Island.
25 May 1945
2× Ki-43 III; Allied ship West of Okinawa Island.

Original unit; Akeno Instructing Flying Division
20 May 1945
9× Ki-43 III; Allied ship West of Okinawa Island.
25 May 1945
2× Ki-43 III; Allied ship West of Okinawa Island.
28 May 1945
1× Ki-43 III; Allied ship West of Okinawa Island.

Original unit; Akeno Instructing Flying Division
6 May 1945
1× Ki-43 III; Allied ship West of Okinawa Island.
11 May 1945
7× Ki-43 III; Allied ship West of Okinawa Island.
28 May 1945
1× Ki-43 III; Alliedship West of Okinawa Island.

Original unit; Hitachi Instructing Flying Division
11 May 1945
3× Ki-43 III; Allied ship West of Okinawa Island.
25 May 1945
5× Ki-43 III; Allied ship West of Okinawa Island.
28 May 1945
3× Ki-43 III; Allied ship West of Okinawa Island.

Original unit; Hitachi Instructing Flying Division
18 May 1945
8× Ki-43 III; Allied ship West of Okinawa Island.
8 June 1945
1× Ki-43 III; Allied ship West of Okinawa Island.

Original unit; Akeno Instructing Flying Division
25 May 1945
6× Ki-61 Id; Allied ship West of Okinawa Island.
28 May 1945
3× Ki-61 Id; Allied ship West of Okinawa Island.
6 June 1945
1× Ki-61 Id; Allied ship West of Okinawa Island.

Original unit; Akeno Instructing Flying Division
6 May 1945
3× Ki-61 Id; Allied ship West of Okinawa Island.
11 May 1945
3× Ki-61 Id; Allied ship West of Okinawa Island.
25 May 1945
2× Ki-61 Id; Allied ship West of Okinawa Island.
28 May 1945
1× Ki-61 Id; Allied ship West of Okinawa Island.

Original unit; Hitachi Instructing Flying Division
6 May 1945
4× Ki-61 Id; Allied ship West of Okinawa Island.
11 May 1945
3× Ki-61 Id; Allied ship West of Okinawa Island.
25 May 1945
2× Ki-61 Id; Allied ship West of Okinawa Island.
11 June 1945
1× Ki-61 Id; Allied ship West of Okinawa Island.

Original unit; Akeno Instructing Flying Division
25 May 1945
10× Ki-84 I; Allied ship West of Okinawa Island.

Original unit; Akeno Instructing Flying Division
25 May 1945
9× Ki-84 I; Allied ship West of Okinawa Island.
28 May 1945
1× Ki-84 I; Allied ship West of Okinawa Island.

Original unit; Akeno Instructing Flying Division
28 May 1945
3× Ki-84 I; Allied ship West of Okinawa Island.
8 June 1945
6× Ki-84 I; Allied ship West of Okinawa Island.

Original unit; Akeno Instructing Flying Division
4 May 1945
6× Ki-84 I; Allied ship West of Okinawa Island.
11 May 1945
3× Ki-84 I; Allied ship West of Okinawa Island.
25 May 1945
1× Ki-84 I; Allied ship West of Okinawa Island.

Original unit; Hitachi Instructing Flying Division
28 April 1945
7× Ki-84 I; Allied ship West of Okinawa Island.
11 May 1945
3× Ki-84 I; Allied ship West of Okinawa Island.
25 May 1945
1× Ki-84 I; Allied ship West of Okinawa Island.

Original unit; Shimoshizu Instructing Flying Division
3 April 1945
1× Ki-51; Allied ship West of Okinawa Island.
6 April 1945
4× Ki-51; Allied ship West of Okinawa Island.
12 April 1945
2× Ki-51; Allied ship West of Okinawa Island.

Original unit; Hokota Instructing Flying Division
7 June 1945
6× Ki-51; Allied ship West of Okinawa Island.

Original unit; Hokota Instructing Flying Division
11 June 1945
9× Ki-51; Allied ship West of Okinawa Island.

Original unit; Akeno Instructing Flying Division
11 May 1945
3× Ki-27; Allied ship West of Okinawa Island.

Original unit; Akeno Instructing Flying Division
4 May 1945
3× Ki-27; Allied ship West of Okinawa Island.
25 May 1945
2× Ki-27; Allied ship West of Okinawa Island.

Original unit; Akeno Instructing Flying Division
28 April 1945
6× Ki-27; Allied ship West of Okinawa Island.

Original unit; Akeno Instructing Flying Division
8 April 1945
2× Ki-27; Allied ship West of Okinawa Island.
9 April 1945
1× Ki-27; Allied ship off Okinawa Island.

Original unit; Akeno Instructing Flying Division
12 April 1945
3× Ki-27; Allied ship West of Okinawa Island.
16 April 1945
1× Ki-27; Allied ship West of Okinawa Island.

Original unit; First Army Air Force, 53rd Air Division
11 May 1945
3× Ki-43 III; Allied ship West of Okinawa Island.
25 May 1945
3× Ki-43 III; Allied ship West of Okinawa Island.
28 May 1945
3× Ki-43 III; Allied ship West of Okinawa Island.

Original unit; First Army Air Force
Ki-51; No-sorties or unfinished organization.

Original unit; First Army Air Force, 53rd Air Division
27 May 1945
9× Ki-51; Allied ship South of Okinawa Island.

Original unit; First Army Air Force, 53rd Air Division
6 April 1945
12× Ki-51; Allied ship West of Okinawa Island.

Original unit; First Army Air Force, 53rd Air Division
7 April 1945
7× Ki-51; Allied ship West of Okinawa Island.
12 April 1945
1× Ki-51; Allied ship West of Okinawa Island.
13 April 1945
4× Ki-51; Allied ship West of Okinawa Island.

Original unit; First Army Air Force, 53rd Air Division
7 April 1945
4× Ki-51; Allied ship in Nakagusuku Bay.
12 April 1945
4× Ki-51; Allied ship West of Okinawa Island.
13 April 1945
1× Ki-51; Allied ship West of Okinawa Island.
16 April 1945
1× Ki-51; Allied ship West of Okinawa Island.

Original unit; First Army Air Force, 51st Air Division
28 April 1945
6× Ki-27; Allied ship West of Okinawa Island.
11 May 1945
3× Ki-27; Allied convoy off Kadena.

Original unit; First Army Air Force
28 April 1945
6× Ki-27; Allied ship West of Okinawa Island.
29 April 1945
1× Ki-27; Allied ship West of Okinawa Island.
4 May 1945
1× Ki-27; Allied convoy off Kadena.

Original unit; First Army Air Force, 51st Air Division, 40th Educational Squadron
4 May 1945
6× Ki-27; Allied ship West of Okinawa Island.
11 May 1945
1× Ki-27; Allied ship West of Okinawa Island.
25 May 1945
3× Ki-27; Allied ship West of Okinawa Island.
26 May 1945
1× Ki-27; Allied ship West of Okinawa Island.

Original unit; 1st Army Air Force
16 April 1945
10× Ki-36; Allied ship West of Okinawa Island.
22 April 1945
1× Ki-36; Allied ship West of Okinawa Island.

Original unit; First Army Air Force, 52nd Air Division
22 April 1945
11× Ki-55; Allied ship West of Okinawa Island.
27 April 1945
1× Ki-55; Allied ship West of Okinawa Island.

Original unit; First Army Air Force, 52nd Air Division
22 April 1945
11× Ki-55; Allied ship in Nago Bay.
26 April 1945
1× Ki-55; Allied ship West of Okinawa Island.

Original unit; First Army Air Force
Ki-55; No-sorties or unfinished organization.

Original unit; First Army Air Force
Ki-55; No-sorties or unfinished organization.

Original unit; First Army Air Force
Ki-55; No-sorties or unfinished organization.

Original unit; First Army Air Force
Ki-55; No-sorties or unfinished organization.

Original unit; First Army Air Force
Ki-55; No-sorties or unfinished organization.

Original unit; First Army Air Force
Ki-55; No-sorties or unfinished organization.

Original unit; First Army Air Force
Ki-55; No-sorties or unfinished organization.

Original unit; First Army Air Force
Ki-9; No-sorties or unfinished organization.

Original unit; First Army Air Force
Ki-9; No-sorties or unfinished organization.

Original unit; First Army Air Force
Ki-9; No-sorties or unfinished organization.

Original unit; First Army Air Force
Ki-9; No-sorties or unfinished organization.

Original unit; First Army Air Force
Ki-9; No-sorties or unfinished organization.

Original unit; First Army Air Force
Ki-9; No-sorties or unfinished organization.

Original unit; First Army Air Force
Ki-9; No-sorties or unfinished organization.

Original unit; First Army Air Force
Ki-9; No-sorties or unfinished organization.

Original unit; First Army Air Force
Ki-9; No-sorties or unfinished organization.

Original unit; First Army Air Force
Ki-9; No-sorties or unfinished organization.

Original unit; First Army Air Force
Ki-9; No-sorties or unfinished organization.

Original unit; First Army Air Force
Ki-9; No-sorties or unfinished organization.

Original unit; First Army Air Force
Ki-9; No-sorties or unfinished organization.

Original unit; Second Army Air Force
12 April 1945
11× Ki-51; Allied ship West of Okinawa Island.
28 April 1945
1× Ki-51; Allied ship West of Okinawa Island.

Original unit; Second Army Air Force
12 April 1945
11× Ki-51; Allied ship West of Okinawa Island.
13 April 1945
1× Ki-51; Allied ship West of Okinawa Island.
23 April 1945
1× Ki-51; Allied ship West of Okinawa Island.

Original unit; Second Army Air Force
12 April 1945
4× Ki-51; Allied ship West of Okinawa Island.
13 April 1945
5× Ki-51; Allied ship West of Okinawa Island.
6 June 1945
1× Ki-51; Allied ship West of Okinawa Island.

Original unit; Second Army Air Force
22 April 1945
6× Ki-27; Allied ship West of Okinawa Island.
1× Ki-27; Allied ship West of Tokunoshima.
23 April 1945
1× Ki-27; Allied ship West of Okinawa Island.
4 May 1945
2× Ki-27; Allied ship West of Okinawa Island.
25 May 1945
2× Ki-27; Allied ship West of Okinawa Island.

Original unit; Second Army Air Force
16 April 1945
9× Ki-27; Allied ship West of Okinawa Island.
28 April 1945
3× Ki-27; Allied ship West of Okinawa Island.
4 May 1945
1× Ki-27; Allied ship West of Okinawa Island.

Original unit; Second Army Air Force
13 April 1945
5× Ki-27; Allied ship West of Okinawa Island.
16 April 1945
9× Ki-27; Allied ship West of Okinawa Island.

Original unit; Second Army Air Force
16 April 1945
11× Ki-27; Allied ship West of Okinawa Island.
28 April 1945
1× Ki-27; Allied ship West of Okinawa Island.

Original unit; Second Army Air Force, 42nd Educational Squadron
22 April 1945
4× Ki-27; Allied ship West of Okinawa Island.
27 April 1945
1× Ki-27; Allied ship West of Okinawa Island.
28 April 1945
2× Ki-27; Allied ship West of Okinawa Island.
4 May 1945
1× Ki-27; Allied ship West of Okinawa Island.

Original unit; Fifth Army Air Force, 5th Learning Squadron
26 May 1945
7× Ki-61; Allied ship West of Okinawa Island.

Original unit; Fifth Army Air Force, 14th Educational Squadron
3 June 1945
8× Ki-27; Allied ship West of Okinawa Island.

Original unit; Fifth Army Air Force, 18th Educational Squadron
3 June 1945
9× Ki-27; Allied ship West of Okinawa Island.
10 June 1945
2× Ki-27; Allied ship West of Okinawa Island.

Original unit; Fifth Army Air Force, 28th Educational Squadron
6 June 1945
10× Ki-79b; Allied ship West of Okinawa Island.

Original unit; 8th Flying Division
Ki-45 Kai; No-sorties or unfinished organization.

Original unit; 8th Flying Division
Ki-27; No-sorties or unfinished organization.

Original unit; 8th Flying Division
Ki-27; No-sorties or unfinished organization.

Original unit; Akeno Instructing Flying Division
8 June 1945
2× Ki-43 III; Allied ship West of Okinawa Island.

Original unit; Akeno Instructing Flying Division
8 June 1945
2× Ki-43 III; Allied ship West of Okinawa Island.
11 June 1945
1× Ki-43 III; Allied ship West of Okinawa Island.

Original unit; Fourth Army Air Force, 30th Fighter Corps
6 June 1945
5× Ki-61 I; Allied ship West of Okinawa Island.
11 June 1945
1× Ki-61 I; Allied ship West of Okinawa Island.

Original unit; Fourth Army Air Force, 30th Fighter Corps
6 June 1945
3× Ki-61 I; Allied ship West of Okinawa Island.

Original unit; Akeno Instructing Flying Division
6 June 1945
5× Ki-61 I; Allied ship West of Okinawa Island.

Original unit; Fourth Army Air Force, 30th Fighter Corps
22 June 1945
5× Ki-84 I; Allied ship West of Okinawa Island.

Original unit; Fourth Army Air Force, 30th Fighter Corps
1 July 1945
2× Ki-84 I; Allied ship West of Okinawa Island.

Original unit; First Army Air Force, 51st Air Division, 1st Educational Squadron
28 May 1945
2× Ki-27; Allied ship West of Okinawa Island.

Original unit; 1st Army Air Force, 51st Air Division, 1st Educational Squadron
3 June 1945
4× Ki-27; Allied ship West of Okinawa Island.
10 June 1945
1× Ki-27; Allied ship West of Okinawa Island.

Original unit; 1st Army Air Force, 51st Air Division, 40th Educational Squadron
11 June 1945
1× Ki-27; Allied ship West of Okinawa Island.

Original unit; 2nd Army Air Force
27 May 1945
5× Ki-27; Allied ship West of Okinawa Island.
28 May 1945
2× Ki-27; Allied ship West of Okinawa Island.
3 June 1945
1× Ki-27; Allied ship West of Okinawa Island.

Original unit; 2nd Army Air Force
25 May 1945
2× Ki-79; Allied ship West of Okinawa Island.
28 May 1945
8× Ki-79; Allied ship West of Okinawa Island.

Original unit; 2nd Army Air Force
25 May 1945
5× Ki-79; Allied ship West of Okinawa Island.
28 May 1945
5× Ki-79; Allied ship West of Okinawa Island.
1 June 1945
1× Ki-79; Allied ship West of Okinawa Island.

Sei Squadron

Original unit; Hokota Instructing Flying Division
31 May 1945
1× Ki-48; Allied ship West of Okinawa Island.

Original unit; 2nd Army Air Force
12 April 1945
1× Ki-43; Allied carrier task force West of Hualien.

Original unit; 8th Flying Division, 9th Flying Brigade
26 March 1945
4× Ki-51; Allied ship South-West of Naha, Okinawa|Naha.
29 March 1945
1× Ki-51; Allied ship off Okinawa Island.
1 April 1945
2× Ki-51; Allied ship West of Okinawa Island.
8 April 1945
1× Ki-51; Allied ship in Nakagusuku Bay.
22 April 1945
1× Ki-51; Allied ship West of Okinawa Island.

Original unit; 8th Flying Division, 22nd Flying Brigade, 20th Flying Regiment
12 April 1945
1× Ki-43; Allied carrier task force West of Hualien.
13 May 1945
3× Ki-43; Allied ship South-West of Naha.
17 May 1945
4× Ki-43; Allied ship East of Kerama Islands.

Original unit; 2nd Army Air Force
1 April 1945
7× Ki-51; Allied ship West of Okinawa Island.
13 May 1945
3× Ki-51; Allied ship West of Okinawa Island.
17 May 1945
2× Ki-51; Allied ship West of Okinawa Island.
19 July 1945
1× Ki-51; Allied ship West of Okinawa Island.

Original unit; 2nd Army Air Force
27 March 1945
9× Ki-51; Allied ship North-East of Kerama Islands.
3 April 1945
6× Ki-51; Allied ship off Kadena.

Original unit; Akeno Instructing Flying Division
16 April 1945
1× Ki-84; Allied ship off Kadena.
27 April 1945
5× Ki-84; Allied ship off Kadena.
9 May 1945
1× Ki-84; Allied ship West of Naha.
9 June 1945
1× Ki-84; Allied ship West of Okinawa Island.

Original unit; Akeno Instructing Flying Division
28 April 1945
4× Ki-84; Allied ship South of Kerama Islands.
4 May 1945
6× Ki-84; Allied ship off Kadena.
9 May 1945
1× Ki-84; Allied ship West of Naha.

Original unit; Hitachi Instructing Flying Division
3 May 1945
5× Ki-84; Allied ship West of Okinawa Island.
9 May 1945
3× Ki-84; Allied ship West of Naha.

Original unit; Tachiarai Army Flying School
6 April 1945
10× Ki-84; Allied ship West of Okinawa Island.
16 April 1945
1× Ki-84; Allied ship West of Okinawa Island.
27 April 1945
1× Ki-84; Allied ship West of Okinawa Island.

Original unit; Tachiarai Army Flying School
6 April 1945
9× Ki-36; Allied ship West of Okinawa Island.

Original unit; Tachiarai Army Flying School
6 April 1945
7× Ki-36; Allied ship West of Okinawa Island.
16 April 1945
1× Ki-36; Allied ship West of Okinawa Island.

Original unit; 2nd Army Air Force
31 March 1945
3× Ki-43; Allied ship West of Okinawa Island.
1 April 1945
6× Ki-43; Allied ship West of Okinawa Island.

Original unit; 2nd Army Air Force
29 March 1945
3× Ki-27; Allied ship West of Kadena.
11 May 1945
1× Ki-27; Allied ship West of Okinawa Island.

Original unit; 1st Army Air Force
29 March 1945
6× Ki-51; Allied ship West of Okinawa Island.
19 June 1945
1× Ki-51; Allied ship West of Okinawa Island.

Original unit; 1st Army Air Force
2 April 1945
8× Ki-45 Kai; Allied ship West of Kerama Islands.

Original unit; 8th Flying Division
28 April 1945
1× Ki-27; Allied ship west in Kerama Bay.

Original unit; 8th Flying Division
22 April 1945
5× Ki-45 Kai; Allied ship South-West of Aguni Island.
28 April 1945
4× Ki-45 Kai; Allied ship West of Kume Island.

Original unit; 8th Flying Division
4 May 1945
3× Ki-84; Allied ship West of Kume Island.
12 May 1945
2× Ki-84; Allied ship West of Kerama Islands.

Original unit; 8th Flying Division
3 May 1945
1× Ki-45 Kai; Allied ship West of Okinawa Island.
4 May 1945
1× Ki-45 Kai; Allied ship off Kadena.
9 May 1945
1× Ki-45 Kai; Allied ship West of Naha.
12 May 1945
1× Ki-45 Kai; Allied ship West of Kerama Islands.

Shinshō Unit

Original unit; 3rd Army Air Force, 58th Flying Regiment
11 April 1945
2× Ki-51; British ship off Nicobar Islands. 

Original unit; 3rd Army Air Force, 58th Flying Regiment
Ki-67; No-sorties.

Original unit; 3rd Army Air Force, 1st Field Supply Squadron
Ki-67; No-sorties.

Shichisei Unit

Original unit; 3rd Army Air Force, 8th Flying Regiment
Ki-48; No-sorties.

Original unit; 3rd Army Air Force, 21st Flying Regiment
24 January 1945
Ki-45 Kai; British carrier task force off Sumatra, mission failed and aircraft returned to base.

Original unit; 3rd Army Air Force, 26th Flying Regiment
24 January 1945
Ki-43; British carrier task force off Sumatra, mission failed and aircraft returned to base.

Original unit; 3rd Army Air Force, 64th Flying Regiment
Ki-43; No-sorties.

Original unit; 3rd Army Air Force, 44th Independent Chūtai
Ki-51; No-sorties.

Original unit; 3rd Army Air Force, 71st Independent Chūtai
1 March 1945
1× Ki-43; British ship off Nicobar Islands.

Original unit; 3rd Army Air Force, 58th Flying Regiment
24 January 1945
Ki-67; British carrier task force off Sumatra, mission failed and aircraft returned to base.

Original unit; 3rd Army Air Force, 1st Field Supply Squadron
24 January 1945
5 (?)× Ki-67; British carrier task force off Sumatra.

Original unit; 3rd Army Air Force, 1st Field Supply Squadron
Ki-48; No-sorties.

Original unit; 3rd Army Air Force, 17th Educational Squadron
28 June 1945
1× Ki-27; Allied submarine near Jakarta.

Original unit; 3rd Army Air Force, 61st Flying Regiment
19 June 1945
8× Ki-67; British ship off Balikpapan.

Original unit; 3rd Army Air Force, 83rd Flying Regiment
Ki-51; No-sorties.

Original unit; 3rd Army Air Force, 3rd Educational Squadron
25 July 1945
9× Ki-51; British carrier task force off Phuket

Original unit; 3rd Army Air Force, 12th Educational Squadron
No-sorties.

Original unit; 3rd Army Air Force, 26th Educational Squadron
No-sorties.

Original unit; 3rd Army Air Force, 35th Educational Squadron
No-sorties.

Original unit; 3rd Army Air Force, 44th Educational Squadron
No-sorties.

Original unit; 3rd Army Air Force, 45th Educational Squadron
No-sorties.

Original unit; 3rd Army Air Force, 1st Training Squadron
No-sorties.

Original unit; 3rd Army Air Force, 2nd Training Squadron
No-sorties.

Original unit; 3rd Army Air Force, 2nd Training Squadron
No-sorties.

Shinshū Unit

Original unit; Hokota Instructing Flying Division
13 August 1945
5× Ki-45 Kai; U.S. carrier task force East of Cape Inubō.

Original unit; Hokota Instructing Flying Division
Ki-45 Kai; No-sorties.

Original unit; Hokota Instructing Flying Division
Ki-45 Kai; No-sorties.

Original unit; Hokota Instructing Flying Division
Ki-45 Kai; No-sorties.

Original unit; Hokota Instructing Flying Division
Ki-45 Kai; No-sorties.

Original unit; Hokota Instructing Flying Division
Ki-45 Kai; No-sorties.

Original unit; Hokota Instructing Flying Division
Ki-45 Kai; No-sorties.

Original unit; Hokota Instructing Flying Division
Ki-45 Kai; No-sorties.

Original unit; 1st Army Air Force
Ki-48; No-sorties, all Ki-48s were lost by air raid in Nasu airfield on 13 August 1945.

Original unit; 1st Army Air Force
9 August 1945
1× Ki-48; Allied ship off Kamaishi.

Original unit; 10th Flying Division
13 August 1945
1× Ki-9; Allied ship South of Shimoda.

Other named unit

Original unit; Hokota Instructing Flying Division
12 November 1944
4× Ki-48 II Kai; U.S. convoy in Leyte Gulf.
15 November 1944
1× Ki-48 II Kai; U.S. convoy in Leyte Gulf.
20 December 1944
1× Ki-48 II Kai; U.S. convoy in Leyte Gulf.

Original unit; Hamamatsu Instructing Flying Division
7 November 1944
5× Ki-67 "To-Gō"; U.S. carrier task force East of Philippines.
11 November 1944
5× Ki-67 "To-Gō"; U.S. carrier task force East of Philippines.
13 November 1944
4× Ki-67 "To-Gō"; U.S. carrier task force East of Clark Air Base.
15 November 1944
3× Ki-67 "To-Gō"; U.S. ship South of Mindanao.
16 December 1944
1× Ki-67 "To-Gō"; U.S. ship South of Mindoro.
9 January 1945
2× Ki-67 "To-Gō"; U.S. convoy in Lingayen Gulf.
10 January 1945
1× Ki-67 "To-Gō"; U.S. convoy in Lingayen Gulf.
11 January 1945
1× Ki-67 "To-Gō"; U.S. convoy in Lingayen Gulf.
12 January 1945
1× Ki-67 "To-Gō"; U.S. convoy in Lingayen Gulf.

Original unit; 5th Flying Division, 74th Flying Regiment, 95th Flying Regiment
14 December 1944
9× Ki-49; U.S. ship off Negros.

Original unit; 83rd Flying Regiment
21 December 1944
1× Ki-51; U.S. ship off Bacolod.
12 January 1945
1× Ki-51; U.S. ship in Lingayen Gulf.

Original unit; 75th Flying Regiment
13 December 1944
?× Ki-48 II; U.S. ship off Mindoro.
15 December 1944
1× Ki-48 II; U.S. ship off Mindoro.
16 December 1944
1× Ki-48 II; U.S. ship off Mindoro.
21 December 1944
1× Ki-48 II; U.S. ship off Bacolod.
29 December 1944
1× Ki-48 II; U.S. ship off Mindoro.
6 January 1945
1× Ki-48 II; U.S. ship in Lingayen Gulf.
12 January 1945
5× Ki-48 II;  U.S. ship in Lingayen Gulf.

Original unit; 45th Flying Regiment, 208th Flying Regiment
30 December 1944
1× Ki-45 Kai; U.S. ship off San Jose.
4 January 1945
?× Ki-45 Kai; U.S. ship off Mindoro.
6 January 1945
1× Ki-45 Kai; U.S. ship in Lingayen Gulf.
9 January 1945
1× Ki-45 Kai; U.S. ship in Lingayen Gulf.
12 January 1945
2× Ki-45 Kai; U.S. ship in Lingayen Gulf.

Original unit; 4th Army Air Force
17 December 1944
1× Ki-84 Ia; U.S. ship off Mindoro.
20 December 1944
2× Ki-84 Ia; U.S. ship off San Jose.
25 December 1944
1× Ki-84 Ia; U.S. ship in Lingayen Gulf.
8 January 1945
3× Ki-43 II; U.S. ship in Lingayen Gulf.
10 January 1945
4× Ki-43 II; U.S. ship in Lingayen Gulf.
12 January 1945
21× Ki-84 Ia; U.S. ship in Lingayen Gulf.
13 January 1945
2× Ki-84 Ia; U.S. ship in Lingayen Gulf.

Original unit; 8th Army Air Force, 49th Independent Chūtai
27 March 1945
2× Ki-51; Allied ship West of Naha.
28 March 1945
5× Ki-51; Allied ship West of Kerama Islands.

Original unit; 75th Flying Regiment
20 December 1944
1× Ki-48 II; U.S. ship in Leyte Gulf.
7 January 1945
4× Ki-48 II; U.S. ship in Lingayen Gulf.

Flying Regiment and other air unit

1 April 1945
7× Ki-61 I; Allied ship West of Okinawa Island.
3 May 1945
4× Ki-61 I; Allied ship off Kadena.
5 June 1945
4× Ki-61 I; Allied ship off Kadena.

11 April 1945
3× Ki-61 I; Allied ship West of Naha.
18 April 1945
2× Ki-61 I; Allied ship West of Naha.
22 April 1945
3× Ki-61 I; Allied ship in Kerama Bay.
30 April 1945
1× Ki-61 I; Allied ship West of Okinawa Island.
4 May 1945
2× Ki-61 I; Allied ship South of Miyako-jima.
18 May 1945
3× Ki-61 I; Allied ship West of Kadena.
21 May 1945
2× Ki-61 I; Allied ship West of Kadena.

3 May 1945
5× Ki-43; Allied ship off Kadena.
29 May 1945
5× Ki-43; Allied ship West of Okinawa Island.
1 June 1945
2× Ki-43; Allied ship West of Okinawa Island.
6 June 1945
4× Ki-43; Allied ship West of Kerama Islands.

21 May 1945
3× Ki-84 I; Allied ship West of Okinawa Island.
6 June 1945
3× Ki-84 I; Allied ship West of Okinawa Island.

13 September 1944
2× Ki-43; U.S. ship East of Leyte.

2 April 1945
1× Ki-67 "To-Gō", 1× Ki-167 "Sakura-dan"; Allied ship East of Kikai Island.
25 May 1945
3× Ki-67 "To-Gō", 1× Ki-167 "Sakura-dan"; Allied ship West of Naha.

2 April 1945
1× Ki-51; Allied ship West of Okinawa Island.

3 April 1945
6× Ki-61 I; Allied ship South-West of Cape Zampa.
9 April 1945
1× Ki-61 I; Allied ship in Nakagusuku Bay.
11 April 1945
2× Ki-61 I; Allied ship in Nakagusuku Bay.
12 April 1945
1× Ki-61 I; Allied ship West of Taiwan.
28 April 1945
4× Ki-61 I; Allied ship South-West of Kerama Islands.
4 May 1945
2× Ki-61 I; Allied ship West of Kadena.

25 April 1945
4× Ki-67; Allied ship South-West of Kadena.

18 November 1944
4× Ki-84 I; U.S. ship in Leyte Gulf.

20 May 1945
5× Ki-43; Allied ship West of Kadena.
19 July 1945
4× Ki-43; Allied ship West of Naha.

26 March 1945
6× Ki-61 I; Allied ship West of Naha.
1 May 1945
3× Ki-61 I; Allied ship off Kadena.

8 April 1945
1× Ki-51; Allied ship off Nakagusuku Bay.

1 March 1945
2× Ki-43; British ship off Sabang.

19 October 1944
9× Ki-43; British ship off Car Nicobar.

Airborne and ground attack

Original unit; 4th Army Air Force, 208th Flying Regiment
26 November 1944
4× L2D (airborne); Burauen airfield.

Original unit; 1st Raiding Flying Regiment, 74th Flying Regiment, 95th Flying Regiment
6 December 1944
11× Ki-49 (bombing), 4× Ki-49 (airborne), 32× Ki-57 (airborne); Burauen airfield,  Dulag airfield, San Pablo airfield and Tacloban airfield.

Original unit; 1st Raiding Flying Regiment, 3rd Independent Squadron, 60th Flying Regiment
24 May 1945
12× Ki-21 (airborne), 1× Ki-67 (guidance); Yomitan airfield and Kadena airfield.

Original unit; 2nd Army Air Force, 5th Training Squadron
19 August 1945
10× Ki-36/Ki-79; Soviet Red Army near Xinmin.

Footnote
Notes

See also
Kamikaze
List of Imperial Japanese Navy air-to-surface special attack units

Bibliography
Kazuhiko Osuo, Kōjinsha, Tōkyō, Japan.
Kamikaze, 2005 .
Shinbu, 2005, .
Makoto Ikuta, Histories of Army Aerial Special Attack Unit, Business-sha Co., Ltd., Tōkyō, Japan, 1977.
Famous Airplanes of the World, Bunrin-Dō Co., Ltd., Tōkyō, Japan.
Special Edition Vol. 1 Navy Bomber "Ginga" [Frances], 2000, .
And other each volume.
Model Art, Model Art Co. Ltd., Tōkyō, Japan.
No. 416, Special issue Medaled Pilots of Japanese Air Force in World War II, 1993.
No. 439, Special issue Heroes of the Imperial Japanese Navy Air Force in 1937–1945, 1994.
No. 451, Special issue Imperial Japanese Air Force Suicide Attack Unit, 1995.
No. 458, Special issue Imperial Japanese Navy Air Force Suicide Attack Unit "Kamikaze", 1995.
And other each volume.
Ushio Shobō (Ushioshobokojinsha Co., Ltd.), Tōkyō, Japan.
The Maru Special No. 108, Kamikaze Special Attack Forces, 1986.
The Maru Mechanic No. 2, Type 3 Fighter 'Hien''', 1977.
And other each volume.Rekishi Dokuhon, Document of the war No. 42 Overview of Imperial Japanese Army Units'', Shin-Jinbutsuoraisha Co., Ltd., Tōkyō, Japan, 1998, .

Air
Air
Japanese World War II special forces
Japan